The Maghreb highway (in ) is a highway through the Maghreb region of North Africa (passing in Mauritania, Western Sahara, Morocco, Algeria, Tunisia, Libya). The highway is made up of an Atlantic main road (from Nouakchott to Rabat), and a Mediterranean main road (from Rabat to Tripoli).

Detailed route

Moroccan part 

Agadir-Casablanca (480 km – 2010)
Safi-Rabat (313 km – 2016)
Rabat-Oujda (527 km – 2011)
Fnidek-Tétouan (28 km – 2008)
Berrechid-Béni Mellal (173 km – 2015)
Rabat-Tanger Med (308 km – 2016)

Trans saharan expressway:
Tiznit-Dakhla (1055 km – 2023)

Algerian part 

1,216 kilometers in Algeria from the Moroccan border to the Tunisian border (via Tlemcen, Oran, Chlef, Alger, Sétif, Constantine, Annaba and 16 others wilayas) :
 Algeria–Morocco border to Chlef (365 km via Tlemcen and Oran planned for 2010)
 Chlef-Bordj Bou Arreridj (435 km via Alger planned for 2010)
 Bordj Bou Arreridj to Algeria-Tunisia border (365 km via Sétif, Constantine, and Annaba planned for 2011)

Tunisian part 

Algerian border-Tunis (207 km) :
Algeria-Tunisia border to Bousalem (70 km planned for 2020) with two exits to Jendouba and Tabarka 
Bousalem-Oued Zarga (70 km March 2016) with an express way to Béja
Oued Zarga-Medjez el-Bab-Tunis (67 km February 2006)

Tunis-Libyan border (573 km) :
Tunis-Hammamet (51 km 1986)
Hammamet-M'saken (92 km March 1994) with an exit to Sousse
M'saken-Sfax (97 km July 2008) with an exit to Mahdia
Sfax-Gabès (151 km May 2018) 
Gabès to Tunisia-Libya border (182 km planned to enter service in its entirety in 2020)

Libyan part 
 200 kilometers for Libya linking the Tunisia-Libya border to Tripoli tuniso-libyenne à Tripoli.

The Libyan part will be made in partnership with Italy.

References

See also

Transport in Tunisia

Controlled-access highways
Maghreb
Transport in Mauritania
Autoroutes in Morocco
Highways in Algeria
Roads in Tunisia
Roads in Libya